The Ćuk converter (pronounced chook; sometimes incorrectly spelled Cuk, Čuk or Cúk) is a type of buck-boost converter with low ripple current. A Ćuk converter can be seen as a combination of boost converter and buck converter, having one switching device and a mutual capacitor, to couple the energy.

Similar to the buck-boost converter with inverting topology, the output voltage of non-isolated Ćuk converter is typically inverted, with lower or higher values with respect to the input voltage. Usually in DC converters, the inductor is used as a main energy-storage component. In ćuk converter, the main energy-storage component is the capacitor. It is named after Slobodan Ćuk of the California Institute of Technology, who first presented the design.

Non-isolated Ćuk converter
There are variations on the basic Ćuk converter. For example, the coils may share single magnetic core, which drops the output ripple, and adds efficiency. Because the power transfer flows continuously via the capacitor, this type of switcher has minimized EMI radiation. The Ćuk converter allows energy to flow bidirectionally by using a diode and a switch.

Operating principle
A non-isolated Ćuk converter comprises two inductors, two capacitors, a switch (usually a transistor), and a diode. Its schematic can be seen in figure 1. It is an inverting converter, so the output voltage is negative with respect to the input voltage.

The main advantage of this converter is the continuous currents at the input and output of the converter.  The main disadvantage is the high current stress on the switch.

The capacitor C1 is used to transfer energy. It is connected alternately to the input and to the output of the converter via the commutation of the transistor and the diode (see figures 2 and 3).

The two inductors L1 and L2 are used to convert respectively the input voltage source (Vs) and the output voltage source (Vo) into current sources. At a short time scale, an inductor can be considered as a current source as it maintains a constant current. This conversion is necessary because if the capacitor were connected directly to the voltage source, the current would be limited only by the parasitic resistance, resulting in high energy loss. Charging a capacitor with a current source (the inductor) prevents resistive current limiting and its associated energy loss.

As with other converters (buck converter, boost converter, buck–boost converter) the Ćuk converter can either operate in continuous or discontinuous current mode. However, unlike these converters, it can also operate in discontinuous voltage mode (the voltage across the capacitor drops to zero during the commutation cycle).

Continuous mode 

In steady state, the energy stored in the inductors has to remain the same at the beginning and at the end of a commutation cycle. The energy in an inductor is given by:

This implies that the current through the inductors has to be the same at the beginning and the end of the commutation cycle. As the evolution of the current through an inductor is related to the voltage across it:

it can be seen that the average value of the inductor voltages over a commutation period have to be zero to satisfy the steady-state requirements.

If we consider that the capacitors C and C2 are large enough for the voltage ripple across them to be negligible, the inductor voltages become:

 in the off-state, inductor L1 is connected in series with Vs and C1 (see figure 2). Therefore . As the diode D is forward biased (we consider zero voltage drop), L2 is directly connected to the output capacitor. Therefore 
 in the on-state, inductor L1 is directly connected to the input source. Therefore . Inductor L2 is connected in series with C and the output capacitor, so 

The average values of VL1 and VL2 are therefore:

As both average voltage have to be zero to satisfy the steady-state conditions, using the last equation we can write:

So the average voltage across L1 becomes:

Which can be written as:

It can be seen that this relation is the same as that obtained for the buck–boost converter.

Discontinuous mode 
Like all DC/DC converters, Ćuk converters rely on the ability of the inductors in the circuit to provide continuous current, in much the same way a capacitor in a rectifier filter provides continuous voltage. If this inductor is too small or below the "critical inductance", then the inductor current slope will be discontinuous where the current goes to zero. This state of operation is usually not studied in much depth as it is generally not used beyond a demonstrating of why the minimum inductance is crucial, although it may occur when maintaining a standby voltage at a much lower current than the converter was designed for.

The minimum inductance is given by:

Where  is the switching frequency.

Isolated Ćuk converter

For isolated version of Ćuk converter, an AC transformer and an additional capacitor must be added. Because the isolated Ćuk converter is isolated, the output-voltage polarity can be chosen freely.

As the non-isolated Ćuk converter, the isolated Ćuk converter can have an output voltage magnitude that is either greater than or less than the input voltage magnitude, even with a 1:1 AC transformer. However, the turns ratio can be controlled to reduce device stress on the input side. Additionally, the parasitic elements of the transformer, namely leakage inductance and magnetizing inductance can be used to modify the circuit into a resonant converter circuit which has much improved efficiency.

Related structures

Inductor coupling
Instead of using two discrete inductor components, many designers implement a coupled inductor Ćuk converter, using a single magnetic component that includes both inductors on the same core. The transformer action between the inductors inside that component gives a coupled inductor Ćuk converter with lower output ripple than a Ćuk converter using two independent discrete inductor components.

Zeta converter
A zeta converter is a non-isolated, non-inverting, buck-boost power supply topology.

Single-ended primary-inductance converter (SEPIC)

A SEPIC converter is able to step-up or step-down the voltage.

Patents
 US Patent 4257087, filed in 1979, "DC-to-DC switching converter with zero input and output current ripple and integrated magnetics circuits", inventor Slobodan Ćuk.
 US Patent 4274133, filed in 1979, "DC-to-DC Converter having reduced ripple without need for adjustments", inventor Slobodan Ćuk and R. D. Middlebrook.
 US Patent 4184197, filed in 1977, "DC-to-DC switching converter", inventor Slobodan Ćuk and R. D. Middlebrook.

Further reading
 Power Electronics, Vol. 4: State-Space Averaging and Ćuk Converters; Ćuk Slobodan; 378 pages; 2016; .

References

External links
 Topology Background

DC-to-DC converters
Voltage regulation